The Gwen Harwood Poetry Prize (also known as the Gwen Harwood Memorial Poetry Prize) was created in 1996 in memory of the Tasmanian poet, Gwen Harwood. The prize is run by Island Magazine and is awarded to a single poem or a linked suite of poems. It has a first prize of A$2,000, and the judges may award two minor prizes.

Winners 
 2021/2022: Stuart Barnes for Sestina after B. Carlisle
 2020/2021: Amy Crutchfield for The Memory of Water
 2018: Damen O'Brien for On the Day You Launch
 2017: Meredith Wattison for The Munchian O
 2016: Kate Wellington for Correspondence and Stuart Cooke for In Memory
 2015: Dan Disney
 2014: Tim Thorne for Fukushima Suite and Alex Skovron for For Length of Days
 2013: Chloe Wilson for Blackbirds en Masse and Jan Sullivan for Tour de France
 2012: Fiona Hile for Bush Poem With Subtitles David Bunn for In Dreams Let Us Not Use First Names
 2011: Sarah Rice for Against The Grain
 2010: Maureen O'Shaunhnessy for Thursday, July 15
 2009: Michael Robinson for A Letter on Youth Homelessness
 2008: Angela Malone for Drawing in the Birth Room
 2007: Sandy Fitts for Waiting for Goya
 2006: Elizabeth Campbell for Structure of the Horse's Eye
 2005: Mark Tredinnick
 2004: Lesley Walter for Hyphenated Lives
 2003: Kathryn Lomer
 2002: Held over to be part of Tasmania Pacific Region Prize awards day
 2000: Jan Owen
 1998: Doris Brett
 1997: M. T. C. Cronin for The Confetti Stone
 1996: Anthony Lawrence for The Grim Periphery

References

External links
 The AusLit Gateway News July/August 2004 Accessed: 2007-08-03
 Blusterhead: Awards, Prizes Glory Accessed: 2007-08-03
 The Gwen Harwood Poetry Prize 2006 Results Accessed: 2007-08-03
 "News from Island Magazine's David Owen, 27 November 2002" in ''North of the Latte Line" Accessed: 2007-08-03

Australian poetry awards
Awards established in 1996